Pierre Simard (1954 Québec) is a Canadian professor of social sciences who applies economic theory to political science.

Career
Born in Québec, Simard received a bachelor's degree in economics (1978), a master's degree in policy analysis (1980) and a Ph.D in political science (1985), from the Université Laval.

Simard has been a professor at the École nationale d’administration publique (ENAP) since 1984. He started as a Research Professor at the Centre d'études politiques et administratives du Québec (CEPAQ).  In 1989, Simard became a regular Professor at the ENAP. He specializes in policy analysis and evaluation of public programs. He has also been a consultant for  public and private agencies.

Ideas
Simard defends a liberal vision of the role of the State. He is a defender of individual liberties, free market and reducing the size of the State. Simard is a specialist of Public Choice: a discipline that applies economic theory to political science. He strongly criticizes public inefficiency through the major Quebec newspapers.

Publications
 BEAUDOIN André, Pierre SIMARD, Daniel TURCOTTE (dir.) (2002) Évaluation des centres de ressources périnatales, Québec, Centre de recherche sur les services communautaires de l'Université Laval.
 BEAUDOIN  André, Pierre SIMARD, Daniel TURCOTTE et Jean TURGEON (dir.) (2000). L’éducation familiale en milieu défavorisé : portrait québécois du Programme d'action communautaire pour les enfants, Québec, Éditions Sylvain Harvey, 199 p. (LC37E24.2000)
 COMEAU Yvan, Daniel TURCOTTE, André BEAUDOIN, Pierre SIMARD, Julie CHARTRAND-BEAUREGARD, Marie-Êve HARVEY, Daniel MALTAIS, Claudie SAINT-HILAIRE,. L'économie sociale et le Plan d'action du Sommet sur l'économie et l'emploi, Québec, ENAP et Centre de recherche sur les services communautaires de l'Université Laval, novembre 2000, 337p.
 MARCEAU Richard, Pierre SIMARD  (1986). Des élus et des milliards : l'assainissement des eaux usées domestiques au Québec, Québec, CEPAQ, ENAP, 196 p. (JF 1338.B595 8)

External links
 ENAP: http://www.enap.ca/enap/fr/accueil.aspx
 Personal website: http://angledroit.ning.com/profile/PierreSimard

Canadian political scientists
Living people
Year of birth missing (living people)
Université Laval alumni